Cybocephalus californicus is a species of beetle in the family Cybocephalidae. It is found in North America. It can grow to be 0.95 mm to 1.30 mm in size.

References

Further reading

 
 

Cucujoidea
Articles created by Qbugbot
Beetles described in 1879